John Joseph McGrath (July 23, 1872 – August 25, 1951) was a U.S. Representative from California for three terms from 1933 to 1939.

Biography 
Born in Limerick, Ireland, he immigrated to the United States at the age of seventeen, living initially in Chicago. He studied law briefly and worked as a salesman and sales manager for many years, becoming a U.S. citizen in 1896.

In California he served as postmaster of San Mateo from 1916 to 1925, and as a justice of the peace in San Mateo County from 1928 to 1932.

Congress 
In 1932 he was elected to Congress as a Democrat, defeating incumbent Arthur M. Free in the 8th district, which ran from San Mateo County south across Santa Clara, Santa Cruz, and Monterey Counties. He served three full terms from 1933 to 1939, but was defeated for reelection in 1938 by Republican Jack Z. Anderson.

Later career and death 
Subsequently, he served as commissioner for immigration and naturalization in San Francisco from 1939 to 1940 before retiring. He died in 1951 in San Mateo.

References

1872 births
1951 deaths
Democratic Party members of the United States House of Representatives from California
Irish emigrants to the United States (before 1923)
San Francisco Bay Area politicians